Fan Ji (died in the 7th century BC), was the Queen consort of King Zhuang of Chu.  

She acted as the political adviser of her spouse, and has been portrayed as a positive role model for women in Chinese history.

References 

7th-century BC births
7th-century BC deaths
7th-century BC Chinese women
7th-century BC Chinese people